Karin Danner  (born 22 January 1959) is a German football manager and former footballer. She has been the manager of FC Bayern München since 1995 and previously played for the Germany women's national football team in 1984 as well as FC Bayern München. On club level she played for FC Bayern München.

References

External links
 Profile at soccerdonna.de

1959 births
Living people
German women's footballers
Footballers from Munich
Germany women's international footballers
Women's association football midfielders